Year of the Gentleman is the third studio album by American singer and songwriter Ne-Yo. It was released by Compound Entertainment and Def Jam Recordings on September 16, 2008 in the United States. As with his previous albums In My Own Words (2006) and Because of You (2007), Ne-Yo worked with Stargate, Reggie "Syience" Perry, and Shea Taylor on much of the album, but also consulted new collaborators, including Chuck Harmony, Polow da Don, The Stereotypes, Butter Beats, and Shomari "Sho" Wilson.

The album was a commercial success, charting in the top-10 in several countries. Year of the Gentleman reached number two on the US Billboard 200 and was eventually certified platinum by the Recording Industry Association of America (RIAA), for shipments of one million copies in the United States, making it his third platinum-selling album as well as his third consecutive top ten album following Because of You. It has also been certified double platinum by the British Phonographic Industry (BPI), for shipments of 600,000 copies in the United Kingdom. It was also certified in Canada, Italy, Japan, New Zealand, and Saudi Arabia.

Released to favorable reviews from music critics, Year of the Gentleman earned Ne-Yo six Grammy nominations, including Album of the Year and Best Contemporary R&B Album at the 51st award ceremony. Rolling Stone ranked it number 33 on its list of the 50 Best albums of 2008. In support of the album, Def Jam released four singles, including international hit singles "Closer" and "Miss Independent", as well as "Mad" and "Part of the List".

Background
Year of the Gentleman was named in honor of Ne-Yo's artistic influences. Ne-Yo cited the 1960s American group Rat Pack, particularly members Frank Sinatra and Sammy Davis, Jr. as influences, whose style inspired his clothes and music. Explaining the album's title, he said he was "trying to take it back to where you couldn't walk out of the house unless you looked your best". Commenting on the likes of the Rat Pack and Nat King Cole he commented that "they're suited and everything is right from top to bottom. Not saying it has to be a suit, 'cause clothes don't make the man — it's the attitude and person. The music needs to personify that.". No featurings are present on the album, as previously announced, though "Single" also features as a version with New Kids on the Block on their album, The Block.

Although Ne-Yo has claimed that he wanted to "take a different direction" on the album by enlarge his R&B sounds. According to Billboard magazine, "it seems he still has a heavy—yet welcome—case of the (rhythm and) blues on the finished product". The scene in the background for the cover was shot at the  million mansion, known as Pink Palace, in the Buckhead district of Atlanta, Georgia.

Release and promotion

The first single, "Closer", was released on April 15. The song debuted at number twenty-two on the UK Singles Chart, and later reached number one. On Billboard's Hot 100, the song peaked at number seven, while it has reached number one on the Hot 100 Airplay chart. The second single was supposed to be "Stop This World", but was replaced by "Miss Independent", which was released on August 11. The physical release will be accompanied by a video which premiered on August 21 on Access Granted.
Both of these songs are produced and co-written by Stargate. The album was re-released on December 3, 2008 in Japan, featuring the original Japanese bonus tracks, "What's The Matter" and "She Got Her Own" (featuring Fabolous & Jamie Foxx), as well as two remixes of "Closer" and an exclusive US iTunes track "In The Way" (track list on hmv.co.jp)

The third single is confirmed to be "Mad" and goes for adds on Urban/Rhythmic on October 14, 2008. A video has been made for song "She Got Her Own" and is the official international single. On May 21, 2008—months before the album's release—Ne-Yo performed the ballad "Stop This World" on the ABC soap opera All My Children. Appearing as himself, Ne-Yo sang the song during the lavish wedding ceremony of supercouple Jesse and Angie Hubbard. The fourth single is confirmed to be "Part of the List". The music video is shot in Prague on March 22. Director is TAJ of the Popular Kid. Video produced by Andrew Listermann of Riveting Entertainment.

Critical response

Year of the Gentleman became his most well received album by critics at the time. At Metacritic, which assigns a normalized rating out of 100 to reviews from critics, the album received an average score of 79, which indicates "generally favorable" reviews, based on 12 reviews. In her review for Rolling Stone, Caryn Ganz stated that "the 28-year-old singer-songwriter says his latest collection of heartfelt love songs is a tribute to the Rat Pack's pressed-suit style, but it's actually a superb concept album about what a great boyfriend he can be." Vibes Brad Wete wrote that Ne-Yo "is a stronger, more confident man than the one many remember licking his wounds" on his previous work. Newsday writer Glenn Gamboa gave it an A− rating and wrote "for the bulk of the album, Ne-Yo has simply honed his hit-making skills, churning out one memorable melody after another, building an album that finally lives up to the potential he only hinted at on his first two releases, both lyrically and vocally."

Amy Linden of The Village Voice said that the album "reconfigures 'grown and sexy' by detailing relationships with an often uneasy mix of heartache, reflection, wit, lust, and resignation." Steve Jones from USA Today found that "considering how many hit songs he generates for other artists, it's a testament to his attention to storytelling detail that he has so much good material for himself [...] To his credit, he keeps his disc guest star-free, despite his A-list outside collaborations. In just over two years, he has shown significant growth through three worthy albums, hinting that he may only be scratching the surface of his potential." Robert Christgau gave the album a rating of honorable mention, indicating a "likable effort consumers attuned to its overriding aesthetic or individual vision may well enjoy". However, Slant Magazine's Eric Henderson found it "musically uneven and ballad-heavy," while Nathan Rabin, writer for The A.V. Club, noted that Ne-Yo's "winning groove devolves into a rut, and his quiet storm gets awfully sleepy."

Commercial performance
Year of the Gentleman debuted at number two on the Billboard 200 with 250,000 copies sold making his first album not to debut at number one on the chart. The album debuted at number two on the UK Albums Chart, giving Ne-Yo his highest-charting album in the UK, beating Because of You, which debuted at number six in 2007. In Japan, the album debuted at number one and has thus far sold over 200,000 copies and in the UK 100,000 copies in its first week. The album has since been certified platinum in the UK.

Track listing

Notes
 signifies a co-producer
"She Got Her Own" contains portions of "My Baby Understands", as written and performed by Donna Summer.

Personnel 
Credits for Year of a Gentleman adapted from Allmusic and album's liner notes.

Kirven Arrington – producer and engineer (track 1)
 Davis A. Barnett – viola (track 12)
 Jesse Bond – guitar (track 12)
 Jay Brown – A&R 
 Chavez – assistant mix engineer (tracks 9, 12)
 Jeff Chestek – string engineer (track 12)
 Carol Corless – package production
 Ryan D – assistant mixing engineer (tracks 1, 10)
 Kevin "KD" Davis – mixing (tracks 1, 2, 6, 7, 9-12)
 Mikkel S. Eriksen – producer, engineer, and instrumentation (tracks 1, 4, 5, 10)
 Larry Gold – string arranger and conductor (track 12)
 Jaymz Hardy-Martin III – engineer (tracks 7, 11), vocal engineer and mixing (track 8)
 Chuck Harmony – producer (tracks 9, 12), string arrangement (track 12)
 Reynell "Tango" Hay – A&R
 Tor Erik Hermansen – producer and instrumentation (tracks 1, 4, 5, 10)
 Josh Houghkirk – additional engineering (tracks 3-5), assistant mix engineer (track 9)
 Nicole Jackson – A&R
 Terese Joseph – A&R
 Olga Konopelsky – violin (track 12)
 Emma Kummrow – violin (track 12)
 Daniele Laporte – tracking (track 11)
 Alexandra Leem – viola (track 12)
 Jennie Lorenzo – cello (track 12)
 Rob Martin – violin (track 12)
 Micayle "The Mack" McKinney – keyboards (track 6)
 Ne-Yo – vocals (all tracks), co-producer (tracks 1, 4, 5, 10), executive producer
 Charles Parker – violin (track 12)
 Polow da Don – producer (track 3)
 Herb Powers – mastering 
 Geno Regist – engineer (tracks 6, 9, 12)
 L.A. Reid – executive producer
 Montez Roberts – assistant engineer (track 12)
 J. Peter Robinson – art direction, design
 John Stahl – assistant engineer (track 12)
 Chris Stanford – photography 
 The Stereotypes – producers (track 6)
 Bernt Rune Stray – guitar (tracks 1, 10)
 Syience – producer and instrumentation(track 8)
 Igor Szwec – violin (track 12)
 Phil Tan – mixing (tracks 3-5, 9)
 Shea Taylor – producer, guitar, drum programming, piano, strings, bass and synths (track 11)
 Gregory Teperman – violin (track 12)
 Tony Terrebonne – engineer (track 3)
 Brandon Thomas – guitar (track 9)
 Shomari "Sho" Wilson – producer and instrumentation (track 7)

Charts

Weekly charts

Year-end charts

Certifications

Release history

References

External links
 Year of the Gentleman at Discogs
 
 Ne-Yo in His Own Words — Blues & Soul

2008 albums
Def Jam Recordings albums
Albums produced by Polow da Don
Albums produced by J. R. Rotem
Albums produced by Stargate
Albums produced by Ne-Yo
Albums produced by Chuck Harmony
Ne-Yo albums